WOMEX (short for Worldwide Music Expo) is an international world music support and development project based in Berlin, whose main event is an exposition held annually in different locations throughout Europe. It integrates a trade fair, showcases, conferences, film screenings, networking sessions, and awards. Musicians and their labels have the possibility to make contacts for international touring and album distribution.

For 2009–2011, WOMEX was hosted in Copenhagen, Denmark in a new partnership with WorldMusicFair Copenhagen, a consortium of the Roskilde Festival, the Copenhagen Jazz Festival, and tourist organization Wonderful Copenhagen. Additional partners were the events producers Welcome, the Danish Center for Culture and Development, Global CPH and World Music Denmark. Other locations of past WOMEX events: Berlin (1994, 1999, 2000), Brussels (1995), Marseille (1997), Stockholm (1998), Rotterdam (2001), Essen (2002, 2004), Newcastle upon Tyne (2005) and Seville (2003, 2006, 2007, 2008), Copenhagen (2009, 2010, 2011), Thessaloniki (2012), Cardiff (2013), Santiago de Compostela (2014 and again in 2016), Budapest (2015), Katowice (2017), Las Palmas de Gran Canaria (2018), Tampere (2019), digital edition Budapest (2020), Porto (2021) and Lisbon (2022). The 2023 WOMEX will be held in A Coruña.

Event
WOMEX runs during October every year, and in many cases, during the last October weekend. On-site registration begins on Wednesday, when the opening ceremony is held. Conference attendees can visit the opening event, the conference program, the trade fair, the showcases on the evenings of Thursday, Friday and Saturday and the WOMEX awards on Sunday, the last day of the event. Although WOMEX is primarily intended for professionals and trade visitors within the world music scene, locals and tourists can buy tickets for most of the evening showcases. In 2020, due to COVID-19, WOMEX for the very first time took place digitally.

Company
WOMEX was begun in 1994. Founders include Christoph Borkowsky and Ben Mandelson.

Awards

The WOMEX Awards were first introduced in 1999. Since then, WOMEX presents its awards to artists or professionals each year for special achievements in the international music industry. Since 2006 WOMEX, in coordination with World Music Charts Europe and, from 2017 on, also with Transglobal World Music Chart, has presented Top 20 labels of the year who had the most chart-topping artist releases.

Other music fairs

 SXSW in Austin, Texas
 Midem in Cannes, France
 Jazzfest, in New Orleans, Louisiana
 Moshito, in Johannesburg, South Africa
 Jazz Ahead, in Bremen, Germany
 Classical Next, location varies from year to year, just like WOMEX (same organizers).
 Berlin Music Week, in Berlin, Germany
 Medimex, in Bari, Italy
 Reeperbahnfestival, in Hamburg, Germany
 Eurosonic Noorderslag in Groningen, The Netherlands
 Indonesian Music Meeting in Jogjakarta, Indonesia
 Visa for Music in Rabat, Morocco
 Mundial Montréal in Montréal, Canada

References

External links

 Official website
 virtualWOMEX
 All artists who have performed at WOMEX

Music conferences
Trade fairs in Germany
World music festivals